This is a list of articles that describe particular biomolecules or types of biomolecules.

A 
For substances with an A- or α- prefix such as 
α-amylase, please see the parent page (in this case Amylase).

 A23187 (Calcimycin, Calcium Ionophore) 
 Abamectine
 Abietic acid
 Acetic acid
 Acetylcholine
 Actin
 Actinomycin D
 Adenine
 Adenosmeme
 Adenosine diphosphate (ADP)
 Adenosine monophosphate (AMP)
 Adenosine triphosphate (ATP)
 Adenylate cyclase
 Adiponectin
 Adonitol
 Adrenaline, epinephrine
 Adrenocorticotropic hormone (ACTH)
 Aequorin
 Aflatoxin
 Agar
 Alamethicin
 Alanine
 Albumins
 Aldosterone
 Aleurone
 Alpha-amanitin
 Alpha-MSH (Melaninocyte stimulating hormone)
 Allantoin
 Allethrin
 α-Amanatin, see Alpha-amanitin
 Amino acid
 Amylase (also see α-amylase)
 Anabolic steroid
 Anandamide (ANA)
 Androgen
 Anethole
 Angiotensinogen
 Anisomycin
 Antidiuretic hormone (ADH)
 Anti-Müllerian hormone (AMH)
 Arabinose
 Arginine
 Argonaute
 Ascomycin
 Ascorbic acid (vitamin C)
 Asparagine
 Aspartic acid
 Asymmetric dimethylarginine
 ATP synthase
 Atrial-natriuretic peptide (ANP)
 Auxin
 Avidin
 Azadirachtin A – C35H44O16

B 

 Bacteriocin
 Beauvericin
 beta-Hydroxy beta-methylbutyric acid
 beta-Hydroxybutyric acid
 Bicuculline
 Bilirubin
 Biopolymer
 Biotin (Vitamin H)
 Brefeldin A
 Brassinolide
 Brucine
 Butyric acid

C 

 Cadaverine
 Caffeine
 Calciferol (Vitamin D)
 Calcitonin
 Calmodulin
 Calreticulin
 Camphor - (C10H16O)
 Cannabinol - (C21H26O2)
 Capsaicin
 Carbohydrase
 Carbohydrate
 Carnitine
 Carrageenan
 Carotinoid
 Casein
 Caspase
 Catecholamine
 Cellulase
 Cellulose - (C6H10O5)x
 Cerulenin
 Cetrimonium bromide (Cetrimide) - C19H42BrN
 Chelerythrine
 Chromomycin A3
 Chaparonin
 Chitin
 α-Chloralose
 Chlorophyll
 Cholecystokinin (CCK)
 Cholesterol
 Choline
 Chondroitin sulfate
 Cinnamaldehyde
 Citral
 Citric acid
 Citrinin
 Citronellal
 Citronellol
 Citrulline
 Cobalamin (vitamin B12)
 Coenzyme
 Coenzyme Q
 Colchicine
 Collagen
 Coniine
 Corticosteroid
 Corticosterone
 Corticotropin-releasing hormone (CRH)
 Cortisol
 Creatine
 Creatine kinase
 Crystallin
 Cyclic adenosine monophosphate (cAMP)
 α-Cyclodextrin
 Cyclodextrin glycosyltransferase
 Cyclooxygenase
 Cyclopamine
 Cyclopiazonic acid
 Cysteine
 Cystine
 Cytidine
 Cytochalasin
 Cytochalasin E
 Cytochrome
 Cytochrome C
 Cytochrome c oxidase
 Cytochrome c peroxidase
 Cytokine
 Cytosine – C4H5N3O

D 

Dehydroepiandrosterone (DHEA)
Deoxycholic acid
DON (DeoxyNivalenol)
Deoxyribofuranose
Deoxyribose
Deoxyribonucleic acid (DNA)
Dextran
Dextrin
Dicer
Dihydrotestosterone
DNA
DNA polymerase
DNA ligase
Dopamine

E 

Endonuclease
Enzyme
Ephedrine
Epinephrine – C9H13NO3
Erucic acid – CH3(CH2)7CH=CH(CH2)11COOH
Erythritol
Erythropoietin (EPO)
Estradiol
Estriol
Estrogen
Estrone
Eugenol
Exonuclease

F 

 Fatty acid
Ferredoxin
 Fibrin
 Fibronectin
Flavin adenine dinucleotide (FAD)
 Folic acid (Vitamin M)
 Follicle stimulating hormone (FSH)
 Formaldehyde
 Formic acid
 Formnoci
 Fructose
 Fumonisin B1

G 

Galactose
Gangalioside
Gamma globulin
Gamma-aminobutyric acid
Gamma-butyrolactone
Gamma-hydroxybutyrate (GHB)
Gastrin
Gelatin
Geraniol
Ghrelin
Globulin
Glucagon
Glucagon-like peptide 1
Glucagon-like peptide 2
Glucosamine
Glucose – C6H12O6
Glucose oxidase
Glutamic acid
Glutamine
Glutamate (neurotransmitter)
Glutathione
Gluten
Glycan
Glycerin (glycerol)
Glycine
Glycogen
Glycogenin
Glycogen synthase
Glycogen phosphorylase
Glycolic acid
Glycolipid
Glycoprotein
Gonadotropin-releasing hormone (GnRH)
Granzyme
Green fluorescent protein
Growth factor
Growth hormone
Growth hormone-releasing hormone (GHRH)
GTPase
Guanine
Guanosine
Guanosine triphosphate (+GTP)
Gurungase

H 
Haptoglobin
Helicase
Hematoxylin
Heme
Hemerythrin
Hemocyanin
Hemoglobin
Hemoprotein
Heparan sulfate
High density lipoprotein, HDL
Histamine
Histidine
Histone
Histone methyltransferase
HLA antigen
Homocysteine
Hormone
human chorionic gonadotropin  (hCG)
Human growth hormone
Hyaluronate
Hyaluronic acid
Hyaluronidase
Hydrogen peroxide
5-Hydroxymethylcytosine
Hydroxyproline
5-Hydroxytryptamine

I 

Indigo dye
Indole
Inosine
Inositol
Insulin
Insulin-like growth factor
Integral membrane protein
Integrase
Integrin
Intein
Interferon
Interleukin
Inulin
Ionomycin
Ionone
Isoleucine
Isomerase
Isoprene
Iron–sulfur cluster

J 
Jipitol

K 

K252a
K252b
KT5720
KT5823
Keratin
Kinase
Kisspeptin
Kouhestanimine

L 
For substances with an l- or L- prefix such as L-alanine or DL-alanine, please see the parent page (in this case alanine).

Lactase
Lactic acid
Lactose
Lanolin
Lauric acid
Lectin
Leptin
Leptomycin B
Leucine
Leukotriene
Ligase
Lignin
Limonene
Linalool
Linoleic acid
Linolenic acid
Lipase
Lipid
Lipid anchored protein
Lipoamide
Lipoprotein
Low density lipoprotein, LDL
Luteinizing hormone (LH)
Lycopene
Lysine
Lysozyme

M 

Malic acid
Maltose
Melanocyte- stimulating hormone (MSH)
Melatonin
Membrane protein
Messenger RNA (mRNA)
Metalloprotein
Metallothionein
Methionine
Mimosine
Mithramycin A
Mitomycin C
Monomer
Morphine
Mycophenolic acid
Myoglobin
Myosin
Mersalase
Milnolate

N 
 Natural phenols
Neurotransmitters
Neuropeptide Y
Nicotinamide adenine dinucleotide (NAD)
Norepinephrine
 Nucleic Acid
Nucleosome
Nucleoside
Nucleotide

O 

Ochratoxin A
Oestrogens
Oligopeptide
Oligomycin
Orcin
Orexin
Ornithine
Oxalic acid
Oxidase
Oxytocin

P 

p53
PABA
Paclitaxel
Palmitic acid
Pantothenic acid (vitamin B5)
parathyroid hormone (PTH)
Paraprotein
Pardaxin
Parthenolide
Patulin
Paxilline
Penicillic acid
Penicillin
Penitrem A
Peptidase
Peptide YY (PYY)
Pepsin
Peptide
Perimycin
Peripheral membrane protein
Perosamine
Phenethylamine
Phenylalanine
Phosphagen
phosphatase
Phosphatidyl choline
Phospholipid
Phenylalanine
Phytic acid
Plant hormones
Plasma protein
Plastocyanin
Polypeptide
Polyphenols
Polysaccharides
Porphyrin
Pranavylate Kinase Kinase
Prion
Progesterone
Prolactin (PRL)
Proline
Propionic acid
Prostaglandins
Protamine
Protease
Proteasome
Protein
Proteinoid
Purine
Putrescine
Pyrethrin
Pyridoxine or pyridoxamine (Vitamin B6)
Pyrimidine
Pyrrolysine
Pyruvic acid

Q 
Quinidine
Quinine
Quinone

R 

Radicicol
Raffinose
Relaxin
Renin
Retinene
Retinol (Vitamin A)
Reverse transcriptase
Rhodopsin (visual purple)
Riboflavin (vitamin B2)
Ribofuranose, Ribose
Ribozyme
Ricin
RNA - Ribonucleic acid
RNA polymerase
RuBisCO
Ribosomal RNA

S 

 Safrole
 Salicylaldehyde
 Salicylic acid
 Salvinorin-A – C23H28O8
 Saponin
 Secretin
 Selenocysteine
 Selenomethionine
 Selenoprotein
 Serine
 Serine kinase
 Serotonin
 Skatole
 Signal recognition particle
 Somatostatin
 Sorbic acid
Sphingolipid
 Sphingosine
 Squalene
 Staurosporin
 Stearic acid
 Sterigmatocystin
 Sterol
 Strychnine
 Sucrose (sugar)
 Sugars (in general)
 superoxide

T 

T2 Toxin
Tannic acid
Tannin
Tartaric acid
Taurine
Tetrodotoxin
Telomerase
Thaumatin
Topoisomerase
Tyrosine kinase
Testosterone
Tetrahydrocannabinol (THC)
Tetracycline
Thapsigargin
Thaumatin
Thiamine (vitamin B1) –  C12H17ClN4OS·HCl
Threonine
Thrombopoietin
Thromboxane
Thymidine
Thymine
Transfer RNA (tRNA)
Triacsin C
Thyroid-stimulating hormone (TSH)
Thyrotropin-releasing hormone (TRH)
Thyroxine (T4)
Tocopherol (Vitamin E)
Topoisomerase
Triiodothyronine (T3)
Transmembrane receptor
Trichostatin A
Trophic hormone
Trypsin
Tryptophan
Tubulin
Tunicamycin
Tyrosine

U 

 Ubiquitin
 Uracil
 Urea
 Urease
 Uric acid – C5H4N4O3
 Uridine

V 
 Valine
 Valinomycin
 Vanabins
 Vasopressin
 Verruculogen
 Vitamins (in general)
 Vitamin A (retinol)
 Vitamin B
 Vitamin B1 (thiamine)
 Vitamin B2 (riboflavin)
 Vitamin B3 (niacin or nicotinic acid)
 Vitamin B4 (adenine)
 Vitamin B5 (pantothenic acid)
 Vitamin B6 (pyridoxine or pyridoxamine)
 Vitamin B12 (cobalamin)
 Vitamin C (ascorbic acid)
 Vitamin D (calciferol)
 Vitamin E (tocopherol)
 Vitamin F
 Vitamin H (biotin)
 Vitamin K (naphthoquinone)
 Vitamin M (folic acid)

W 
 Water
 Wortmannin

X 

 Xanthophyll
 Xylose

Y 

 Yellow fluorescent protein

Z 

 Zearalenone

See also 
 Chemical compound
 Organic compound
 biochemistry

 Similar lists
 List of compounds
 List of organic compounds
 List of proteins

Biomolecules
Biomolecules
Biomolecules

cs:Biomolekula#Typy biomolekul
fr:Liste alphabétique de biomolécules